Cox Creek is a stream in Oregon County in the Ozarks of southern Missouri. It is a tributary of the Warm Fork Spring River.

Cox Creek has the name of the local Cox family.

See also
List of rivers of Missouri

References

Rivers of Oregon County, Missouri
Rivers of Missouri